Baroness Sabine de Bethune (born 16 July 1958) is a Belgian politician and a member of the Christian Democratic and Flemish party. Since June 2021 she has been appointed as a judge on the Constitutional Court.

The daughter of former Kortrijk mayor, Emmanuel de Bethune, she belongs to a baronial family of the Belgian nobility, in right of which she is properly styled baroness. Sabine de Bethune. She holds a Master of Laws from the Katholieke Universiteit Leuven.

She was elected as a member of the Belgian Senate in 1995. Sabine is also a member of the AWEPA Governing Council. She was vice-president of the Senate between 1999 and 2003, and became the 34th President of the Belgian Senate on 11 October 2011. She became an Officer in the Order of Leopold on 6 June 2010 and a Grand Officer on 21 May 2014.

Notes

1958 births
Presidents of the Senate (Belgium)
Christian Democratic and Flemish politicians
Living people
Members of the Belgian Federal Parliament
Flemish nobility
People from Kinshasa
21st-century Belgian politicians
21st-century Belgian women politicians
Belgian senators of the 57th legislature
Belgian senators of the 56th legislature